Barb Bellini  (born ) is a Canadian retired female volleyball player, who played as a wing spiker.

Career
She was part of the Canada women's national volleyball team at the 2002 FIVB Volleyball Women's World Championship in Germany. On club level she played with the Puerto Rican club Criollas de Caguas, winning the 2002 league championship.

Clubs
  Criollas de Caguas (2002)

References

External links
 BVB Info Profile

1977 births
Living people
Place of birth missing (living people)
Canadian women's volleyball players
Wing spikers
UBC Thunderbirds women's volleyball players
Canadian expatriate sportspeople in Puerto Rico